Sleepy Time Donald is a Donald Duck animated short film which was released on May 9, 1947, and produced in Technicolor by RKO Radio Pictures. It was the sixth cartoon in Donald's filmography to feature Daisy Duck.

Plot
The short revolves around Daisy's efforts to rescue Donald as he keeps running into danger while sleepwalking.

Voice cast
Clarence Nash as Donald Duck
Gloria Blondell as Daisy Duck

Home media
The short was released on December 11, 2007, on Walt Disney Treasures: The Chronological Donald, Volume Three: 1947-1950.

References

External links
 Cartoon Database link
 
 Sleepy Time Donald

1947 animated films
1947 short films
1940s English-language films
Donald Duck short films
1940s Disney animated short films
Films directed by Jack King
Films produced by Walt Disney
Films about sleep disorders
American animated short films
RKO Pictures short films
RKO Pictures animated short films
Films about ducks
Films scored by Oliver Wallace